Xiulin Township / Sioulin Township is a mountain indigenous township of Hualien County, Taiwan. It is located northwest of Hualien City, and is the largest township in Taiwan by area (1,641.86 km²) with 9 villages. It has a population of 17,068, most of which are the indigenous Taroko people.

Because of its location beside the Central Mountain Range, the climate changes by altitude. Taroko National Park is located in Xiulin Township. In recent years, people in Xiulin have lobbied to change its name to "Taroko Township" (太魯閣鄉).

The Hualien train derailment, the second deadliest train disaster in Taiwan's history, happened here in 2021.

Administrative divisions

The township comprises nine villages: Chongde, Fushi, Heping, Jiamin, Jingmei, Shuiyuan, Tongmen, Wenlan and Xiulin.

Tourist attractions
 Taroko National Park 
 Qingshui Cliff
 Sanchan Creek Scenic Area 
 Mukumugi ecological Trail and preserve area
 Kilai Mountain (3607 m)
 Dayu Mountain (2565 m)
 Hehuanshan (3416 m)
 Pingfeng Mountain
 Xiangde Temple
 Shimen Mountain
 Wuming Mountain

Infrastructure
 Bihai Power Plant
 Hoping Power Plant

Transportation
 TRA Heping Station, Heren Station, Jingmei Station, Chongde Station (North-link line)
 Provincial Highway 8 (Central Cross-Island Highway)
 Provincial Highway 9 (Suhua Highway)
 Heping Cement Port

References

External links

Siou Lin Township Population
Taroko National Park

Townships in Hualien County